Kin Herbert Shriner (born December 6, 1953) is an American actor, best known for his portrayal of Scott Baldwin on the ABC soap opera General Hospital and its spin-off, Port Charles.

Early life
Shriner and his twin brother, actor Wil Shriner, were born in New York City to Pixie ( Eileen McDermott) and Herb Shriner. His father was a popular television personality. The brothers were orphaned when their parents died in an automobile accident when the twins were teenagers. After, the brothers moved to Texas to live with their grandmother.

Career
Shriner was employed by Fuller Brush as a door-to-door salesman before becoming an actor.  He was originally cast as Scott Baldwin on  General Hospital, the role he is best known for playing, in 1977. In the fall of 1980, he left General Hospital and immediately began playing Jeb Hampton on the NBC daytime soap opera Texas. He left that role in 1981 and soon returned to General Hospital, where he remained until 1983, returning again from 1987-1993.  In between those stints, he appeared on the short-lived syndicated daily soap Rituals as hero Mike Gallagher. He also played Dr. Brian Carey on CBS's The Bold and the Beautiful from 1994 to 1995.  

In 1997, he once again returned to playing Scott Baldwin, but this time on General Hospitals spin-off Port Charles.  Port Charles was set in the same fictional city as General Hospital – Port Charles, New York – and featured many of the same characters. In 2000, Shriner returned to General Hospital and quit appearing on Port Charles the next year. He left General Hospital again in 2004, and in that year portrayed Harrison Bartlett on The Young and the Restless.  

In 2005, he joined the cast of As the World Turns in the role of Keith Morrissey until leaving the show in 2006. He returned to General Hospital in 2007 and left the series again in 2008.  In 2013, he returned to General Hospital, where he has remained since. Additionally, in 2011, he served as a temporary fill-in for fellow actor Ted Shackelford on The Young and the Restless, portraying Jeffrey Bardwell until September 2011.

Outside of soap operas, Shriner has appeared on several primetime television programs, playing temporary roles beginning in 1976.  In later years he guest starred on several programs such as ABC's top 10 sitcom Full House.

General Hospital
Shriner is best known for playing Scott Baldwin on General Hospital over all other roles he has played. He was first cast as the character in 1977.  He has left the program several times to play different roles on other soap operas, for short periods of time, but continues to appear as a regular cast member on General Hospital.  He holds the distinction of being one of only a few actors who have appeared on the same scripted television program, in the same role, for six consecutive decades.

Port Charles
Plans to spin off General Hospital were announced in December 1996. ABC had previously passed on the idea of a GH spin-off proposed by former head writer Claire Labine. Tentatively titled GH2, the series was set to revolve around interns at the medical school across from General Hospital. Wendy Riche, executive producer of General Hospital, was hired to fill the same role for the new series. Riche said of the new show, "This will be a multigenerational show, which is the kind of drama we've always done at GH".  It was later announced that the series would be titled Port Charles, after the fictional city where the series are set, and it would star Jon Lindstrom and Lynn Herring, playing their roles from GH.

The series premiered with a two-hour prime time special that aired on June 1, 1997. It started in its regular timeslot, the following day, replacing the canceled The City. The series also featured the return of General Hospital characters Scott Baldwin (Kin Shriner), Gail Baldwin (Susan Brown), Lee Baldwin (Peter Hansen) and Karen Wexler (Jennifer Hammon). After the series premiered, it was unclear if Lindstrom, Herring, and Shriner would remain with the series. It was later confirmed the actors would stay on the show.

Filmography
n.b. for credit listings reference

Television

References

External links
 
 
  
 
 Kin Shriner at Buddy TV
 Kin Shriner at Soap Central
 

1953 births
American male soap opera actors
American male voice actors
Living people
Male actors from New York City
American twins
20th-century American male actors
21st-century American male actors